CaroMont Health Park is a multi-purpose stadium in Gastonia, North Carolina which opened in 2021 as the home of the Gastonia Honey Hunters in the Atlantic League of Professional Baseball, an official Partner League of Major League Baseball. It is part of a  downtown redevelopment plan known as the Franklin Urban Sports and Entertainment (FUSE) District.

The new ballpark was designed to accommodate a variety of other events, including concerts, soccer, lacrosse, and football with an artificial turf surface and a capacity of 5,000.

In May 2021, the Honey Hunters announced that the stadium would be renamed CaroMont Health Park following a ten-year naming rights deal with CaroMont Health, a regional healthcare provider that operates the CaroMont Regional Medical Center and other medical facilities. The stadium's first event was an exhibition baseball game on May 23, 2021, followed by the regular season opening day game on May 25.

The Gaston College Rhinos baseball team used this stadium in early 2022 while Sims Legion Park was undergoing a renovation.

See also
 Sims Legion Park
 List of sports venues in North Carolina

References

External links
 
 

2021 establishments in North Carolina
Atlantic League of Professional Baseball ballparks
Baseball venues in North Carolina
Buildings and structures in Gaston County, North Carolina
Gastonia, North Carolina
Sports venues completed in 2021